The 2001 Election Committee by-election was held on 16 September 2001 after resignation of the incumbent Legislative Councillor Professor Ng Ching-fai who represented one of the six seats in the Election Committee constituency, from the Legislative Council (LegCo) with effect from 15 July 2001.

Ng Ching-fai of the New Century Forum (NCF) resigned in 2001 to take the vice-chancellorship of the Hong Kong Baptist University. NCF convenor Ma Fung-kwok who ran as a nonpartisan was elected with 359 votes, representing about 52% of the total number of valid votes cast, defeating two other candidates, Ho Sai-chu of the Liberal Party and nonpartisan Chan Man-hung.

Candidates
During the nomination period from 2 to August 2001, three nominations were received, including the Liberal Party's Ho Sai-chu, New Century Forum's Ma Fung-kwok, who ran as a nonpartisan, and nonpartisan Chan Man-hung.

Result

See also
 2000 Hong Kong legislative election
 List of Hong Kong by-elections

References

External links
 Electoral Affairs Commission Official Website

2001 in Hong Kong
2001 elections in China
2001
September 2001 events in China